Purni Devi Chaudhuri Girls' College, established in 2004, is a women's college in Bolpur, Birbhum district. It offers undergraduate courses in arts. It is affiliated to  University of Burdwan.

Departments

Arts
Bengali
English
Sanskrit
History

Science
 Geography

Accreditation
The college is recognized by the University Grants Commission (UGC).

See also

References

External links

Women's universities and colleges in West Bengal
Universities and colleges in Birbhum district
Colleges affiliated to University of Burdwan
Educational institutions established in 2004
2004 establishments in West Bengal